The Liberal South East European Network (LIBSEEN) is a South East European alliance of liberal parties and think tanks in the region, founded in Skopje, North Macedonia, in 2008. Its main initiative is to gather liberal parties of Southeastern Europe together and implement liberal policies in their respective countries. Most member organizations of LIBSEEN are also members of Alliance of Liberals and Democrats for Europe Party (ALDE).

Members

 Liberal Democratic Party (Liberalno Demokratska Stranka)
 Our Party (Naša stranka)

 Movement for Rights and Freedoms (Dvizhenie za prava i svobodi)

 Croatian People's Party-Liberal Democrats (Hrvatska Narodna Stranka - Liberalni Demokrati)
 Croatian Social Liberal Party (Hrvatska socijalno liberalna stranka)
 Istrian Democratic Assembly (Istarski demokratski sabor/Dieta Democratica Istriana)

 Hungarian European Society (Magyarországi Európa Társaság)

 Democratic Party of Kosovo (Partia Demokratike e Kosovës)
 New Kosovo Alliance (Aleanca Kosova e Re)

 Liberal Party (Partidul Liberal)

 Liberal Party of Montenegro (Liberalna Partija Crne Gore)

 Liberal Party of Macedonia (Либерална Партија на Македонија, Liberalna Partija na Makedonija)
 Liberal Democratic Party (Либерално Демократска Партија, Liberalno Demokratska Partija)

 USR PLUS (Alianța 2020 USR-PLUS)

 Liberal Democratic Party (Либерално-демократска партија, Liberalno-demokratska partija)
 Movement of Free Citizens (Покрет слободних грађана, Pokret slobodnih građana)
 Civic Platform (Грађанска платформа)
 

 Alliance of Alenka Bratušek (Zavezništvo Alenke Bratušek)
 Modern Centre Party (Stranka modernega centra)
 Novum Institute (New Institute)

See also
 Political parties of the world
 Liberal International
 European Liberal Youth

References

External links 
 Liberal South East European Network

Political parties established in 2008
Pan-European political parties
International liberal organizations